Arabshah-e Daraq (also romanized as ‘Arabshāh-e Daraq) is a village in Yeylaq Rural District, in the Central District of Kaleybar County, East Azerbaijan Province, Iran. At the 2006 census, its population was 16, in 4 families.

References 

Populated places in Kaleybar County